The 2019–20 North American winter was unusually warm for many parts of the United States; in many areas, neutral ENSO conditions controlled the weather patterns, resulting in the sixth-warmest winter on record, and many areas in the Northeastern United States saw one of the least snowy winters in years. In fact, Baltimore and Islip saw no snow in February for the first time. Some notable events still occurred, such as a powerful blizzard that impacted the Western United States in late November, a series of cold shots in January and February, a snowstorm within the Texas Panhandle and a late-season blizzard in the High Plains.

While there is no well-agreed-upon date used to indicate the start of winter in the Northern Hemisphere, there are two definitions of winter which may be used. Based on the astronomical definition, winter begins at the winter solstice, which in 2019 occurred on December 21, and ends at the March equinox, which in 2020 occurred on March 19. Based on the meteorological definition, the first day of winter is December 1 and the last day February 29. Both definitions involve a period of approximately three months, with some variability. Winter is often defined by meteorologists to be the three calendar months with the lowest average temperatures. Since both definitions span the calendar year, it is possible to have a winter storm spanning two different years.

Seasonal forecasts

On October 17, 2019, the National Oceanic and Atmospheric Administration's Climate Prediction Center released its U.S. Winter Outlook. The El Niño–Southern Oscillation was in its neutral phase and was thus not expected to be a key predictor for the season. As a result, other oscillations such as the Madden–Julian Oscillation and the Arctic Oscillation were anticipated to be more significant drivers of the seasonal weather, particularly in the form of large temperature and precipitation swings. From the outlook, the greatest likelihoods for above-normal temperatures were for Alaska and Hawaii, with lower but still above-normal odds of above-average temperatures for most of the lower 48 states. The exception was for the Northern Plains, Upper Mississippi Valley, and western Great Lakes regions, which were ascribed equal changes for above-, near-, or below-average temperatures. No area in the United States was favored to have below-average temperatures. In terms of precipitation, wetter-than-average conditions were most likely in Alaska, Hawaii, part of the Northern Plains, Upper Mississippi Valley, Great Lakes, and parts of the Mid-Atlantic and Northeastern U.S. Drier-than-average conditions were favored for Louisiana and parts of Texas, Mississippi, Arkansas, and Oklahoma, as well as parts of central and northern California, with the rest of the U.S. having equal changes of above-, near-, or below-average precipitation. The drought outlook highlighted the presence of abnormally dry conditions across much of the Southern U.S, with improvement expected in part of the Southeast and Mid-Atlantic regions, Alaska, and Hawaii. Drought was expected to persist in central Texas and the Southwestern U.S, with further development anticipated in parts of central California.

Events

Late September winter storm 
An unusually early winter storm blanketed parts of the northern Rockies at the end of September 2019. Great Falls, Montana recorded  of snow on September 28 and 29th, which is the largest September storm on record in the region and the second largest two day storm on record there, behind April 27-28, 2009. Missoula also saw their heaviest September snow on record. Browning, Montana received  of snow. Spokane, Washington saw their earliest snow in over 100 years and their snowiest September as well, with record cold highs as well on September 29, with Spokane only reaching . Several roads in Glacier National Park were also closed. Then-governor Steve Bullock of Montana declared a state of emergency following the storm.

Early November cold wave 
Record breaking temperatures and snowfall caused disruption throughout the Midwestern United States in early November. On November 12, Chicago set records for a record cold low and high. That was the coldest so early in the season. The  of snow in Detroit made this the largest November snowstorm for the city. In Canada, Southern Ontario and Southern Quebec had their first major winter storm of the season on November 11 and 12 respectively, which was followed by record January-like cold.  of snow fell across much of the region crippling large cities such as Montreal and Toronto. In Montreal, local officials announced the city's earliest ever snow removal operation in the aftermath of the storm. Over 10 school boards province-wide closed the day after the storm. Paducah, Kentucky saw their earliest in winter sub freezing high. This forced Toronto to give an extreme cold alert. Watertown, New York tied their monthly record of  that was previously set the previous winter. This broke many records from the Great Blue Norther of November 11, 1911. At 7:45 am on November 13, 232 million people were in sub freezing conditions. The cold wave also killed six people, and another winter storm related death occurred in Michigan. Due to the cold wave, several locations in Illinois, Indiana and Michigan see a record cold first half of November, with average highs hovering around freezing.

Late November–early December blizzard 

Moving ashore November 26–27 near the border between Oregon and California as an over-achieving bomb cyclone, it produced wind gusts in excess of  near its point of landfall. From November 27–30, the low merged with the subtropical jet stream as it tracked slowly eastward across the Rockies, Great Plains and Midwest. The combination of cold air, moisture and high winds produced a wide swath of blizzard conditions from Colorado through western South Dakota, including the Denver metropolitan area. In Rapid City, South Dakota,  of snow fell on the 30th, breaking the one-day snowfall record for November. In Duluth, Minnesota, where  of snow accumulated, it was the city's heaviest snowstorm in 10 years. As the first major winter storm of the season in the northeast, it dumped  of snow in Albany, New York, where it was the heaviest snowfall since the 1993 Superstorm. The low finally moved out to sea December 3.

Early January storm complex 
A large complex of low pressure systems began developing January 9 over Central North America. A large trough dug into the jet stream over the Southwestern United States, providing arctic air that had been settled over Canada to move southwards and clash with warm, moist air moving northward from the Gulf of Mexico. In the warm sector, severe thunderstorms and tornadoes broke out in the south central United States on the morning of January 10. Tornado warnings were issued for more than 1.7 million in the Dallas-Fort Worth metropolitan area, an at 7:52 pm CST a PDS tornado warning was issued for Scranton, Arkansas and surrounding communities. More than 111,000 customers were left without power in Texas alone. Severe weather continued in the deep south into following day, with Alabama being affected particularly severely. North of the boundary, a mix of heavy snow and freezing rain caused travel problems across the Midwest. Along the Great Lakes, winds were forecast to whip up  waves as lakeshore flooding had already begun in Chicago. Central Michigan through Eastern Ontario received a swath of crippling ice accretion.

January–February cold waves 

A major arctic outbreak affected western Canada and the Pacific Northwest from January 12–19. Extreme cold warnings were issued across all of Alberta, Yukon, the Northwest Territories, most of British Columbia, most of Saskatchewan and part of Manitoba during this period, as a cross-polar flow caused arctic air to settle in the region. Much of Central Alberta dipped below , colder than it was in Siberia at the time.

Following the storm that would go on to become the North Atlantic bomb cyclone, the Ohio River Valley area and parts of the Midwest suffered brutally cold temperatures on January 19. On January 19, Southern New England experienced a flash freeze as a sleet storm impacted central and northern Massachusetts.

It was Chicago's coldest Valentine's Day in 77 years. North of the international border, temperatures fell into the  range as far south as Toronto, where several frostquakes occurred.

Early February winter storm

On February 4 and 5, snow fell in the deep south, primarily in Texas and Oklahoma, where several highways were closed. Snow fell as far south as Austin,  of snow fell in Jayton, Texas, and thundersnow occurred in Big Spring. Interstate 70 in central Missouri was temporarily shut down as road crews cleaned debris in the aftermath of a collision. Schools closed in portions of Texas, Oklahoma and Missouri. 9,000 were left without power in the Oklahoma City metropolitan area. The following day, severe thunderstorms produced flash flooding and tornadoes in the Southeastern United States. In Simpson County, Mississippi, a possible-tornado destroyed several mobile homes. A PDS tornado warning was issued for Charlotte, where those at the airport were relocated to the building's interior. Severe thunderstorms and tornado warnings occurred as far North as Maryland and Delaware. Winter weather advisories were issued from Tennessee to Maine, with warnings concentrated over north-central Pennsylvania, Western New York, and portions of Northern New England. With a precipitation shield of  the storm impacted 16 million across 6 provinces in Canada. The storm was dubbed "Winter Storm Kade" by The Weather Channel.

Mid February Southeast U.S snowstorm 
Similar but slightly lesser amounts occurred in surrounding areas of eastern Tennessee and western North Carolina. Another swath of snow occurred in eastern North Carolina and southeastern Virginia on February 20–21, ending a 400+ day snow-free streak in the region. In preparation for the storm, most school boards closed or had delayed openings, hundreds of flights were cancelled and all of North Carolina was put under a Winter weather advisory. The winter storm was named Winter Storm Nash by The Weather Channel.

Mid-March blizzard 

An area of low pressure incoming from the Pacific drifted down the California coastline the week of March 16, bringing scattered thunderstorms with hail to Southern California. Several rounds of severe thunderstorms occurred in Texas during this time period with the Dallas metropolitan area being especially hit hard. The responsible low pressure area was observed to finally move ashore mid-day on the 18, and the Colorado low began forming shortly afterward. In the Rocky Mountains and Great Plains, blizzard warnings were issued March 17 in anticipation of a very heavy snowfall to be accompanied by strong winds. At Denver's airport over 1,000 flights or around 80% of air traffic that day, were cancelled.

Mid-April  winter storm

Early May cold wave 

On May 9, 2020, the Eastern United States suffered record cold. New York City ties 1977 for its latest trace of snow on record. Even Islip, which went snowless in February, picked up a trace from this event, where temperatures fell to a record low . The National Weather Service Caribou, Maine was forced to issue their first ever May winter storm warning since 2005. Five thousand customers lost power due to the snow in Maine. Several record lows for the entire month of May were set, like Binghamton, New York, Fort Wayne, Indiana, Indianapolis, LaGuardia Airport, and Jackson, Kentucky, and tied ones include State College, Pennsylvania, John F. Kennedy International Airport, and London, Kentucky. Daily record lows persisted into May 12. Nashville saw their coldest  date so late in the year, breaking the previous record from 1968 by 3 days. The high of  tied a record and is typical of early December. Due to Alaska experiencing a major warmup, sending the cold air east, Fairbanks hit  before Philadelphia reached that mark for the first time in history.

References

External links 
 2019 Storm Summaries from the Weather Prediction Center

 
2019 meteorology
North American winters
Winter
2020 in North America
2020 meteorology